Rob Spicer is a professional rugby league footballer who plays for the Dewsbury Rams in the Betfred Championship.

He has previously played at club level for Stanley Rangers, the Wakefield Trinity Wildcats, the York City Knights and the Dewsbury Rams.

References

External links
Featherstone 0-18 Wakefield
Wildcats snare Halpenny
Elsewhere, Halifax Blue Sox drew 26-26 with Wakefield Wildcats...
Wakefield Trinity Wildcats
Wildcats sign Field
Wakefield 40-10 Widnes
Wildcats hit by Field loss
Leeds sign Wildcats skipper Ellis
Double injury blow for Wakefield
Wigan 28-34 Wakefield
O'Neill agrees to make Leigh move
Super League XI
York City 4-26 Crusaders
Knights rue 'embarrassing' loss
Knights face 'massive' home game
Knights record season's first win
Settled side vital for Knights
Ratcliffe is unhappy with Knights
Ratcliffe angry at Knights defeat
Knights struggle with injuries
Knights injury worries pile up
Knights at full strength - March
Championship round-up - week 14
Championship round-up - week 15
Championship round-up - week 21
Barrow boss Steve McCormack slams manner of defeat

Dewsbury Rams players
English rugby league players
Living people
Place of birth missing (living people)
Rugby league centres
Rugby league locks
Rugby league second-rows
Rugby league wingers
Wakefield Trinity players
Year of birth missing (living people)
York City Knights players